The Social Work Department of the Central Committee of the Chinese Communist Party is an agency under the Central Committee of the Chinese Communist Party currently in the process of establishment in charge of "social work".

History 
The department was established in March 2023 under CCP general secretary Xi Jinping after wide-ranging reforms to change the Party and state structure.

Function 
The department will oversee the interactions of the CCP with civic groups, chambers of commerce and industry groups, as well as party-building work in mixed-ownership and non-public enterprises. It will additionally handle public petitions and grievances, and will have a "unified leadership" over the National Public Complaints and Proposals Administration.

References 

Institutions of the Central Committee of the Chinese Communist Party
2023 establishments in China